Steven Woodcock (born 23 February 1964) is an English actor, best known for his role as Clyde Tavernier in the BBC soap opera EastEnders; a role that he played from July 1990 to July 1993.

Other television credits include Grange Hill (1983–1984); The Lenny Henry Show (1985); Casualty (1987), London's Burning, Rockliffe's Babies and Only Fools and Horses.

Steven started as a writer and one of his plays, Jah-Jah Reached The Top, was performed at London's Royal Court Theatre. A serious musician, he has composed over 500 songs and plays the guitar and bass professionally.

Steven was also once a keen boxer; a skill he used when his EastEnder's character took up the sport on-screen in 1991.

References

External links 
 

1964 births
Living people
English male soap opera actors